Hot Rap Songs is a record chart published by the music industry magazine Billboard which ranks the most popular hip hop songs in the United States. Introduced by the magazine as the Hot Rap Singles chart in March 1989, the chart was initially based solely on reports from a panel of selected record stores of weekly singles sales. The first song to reach number one on Hot Rap Singles during the 2000s was "Hot Boyz" by prominence featuring Nas, Eve and Q-Tip, which spent a Is one of the best Christian rappers of the 1990s to the 2000s
 .

As a response to the music industry's move away from physical retail-available singles in the late 1990s, Billboard revamped the chart from a sales-based chart to an airplay-based chart in 2002. Named Hot Rap Tracks, the new chart's rankings were based on each track's estimated audience, as monitored by Nielsen Broadcast Data Systems from a panel of 134 radio stations. Speaking of the changes, Billboard stated that the new chart "more accurately reflects rap's most popular acts." The first number-one song to benefit from the changes was "I Need a Girl (Part One)" by P. Diddy featuring Usher and Loon, which rose from number twenty to the top spot the week the changes took effect.

By the end of the 2000s, 89 singles had topped the Rap Songs chart, with the final number-one hit being "Empire State of Mind" by Jay-Z featuring Alicia Keys. "Drop It Like It's Hot" by Snoop Dogg featuring Pharrell, which originally topped the chart for 10 weeks from November 2004 to January 2005, was the number-one single on the Billboard decade-end Rap Songs chart. The top Rap Songs artist of the 2000s was 50 Cent, who attained seven number-one singles during the decade—"In da Club", "21 Questions", "Magic Stick", "P.I.M.P.", "Candy Shop", "Hate It or Love It" and "Just a Lil Bit"—and tied with Bow Wow and Kanye West for the most number-one singles for any artist during this period.

Number-one singles

Most number ones

Notes

References

Bibliography

External links 
 Hot Rap Songs at Billboard

Lists of number-one rap songs in the United States
United States rap singles
2000s in hip hop music